Billy the Kid's Round-Up is a 1941 American Western film directed by Sam Newfield and written by Fred Myton. The film stars Buster Crabbe, Al St. John, Carleton Young, Joan Barclay, Glenn Strange and Charles King. The film was released on December 12, 1941, by Producers Releasing Corporation.

Plot

Cast          
Buster Crabbe as Billy the Kid
Al St. John as Fuzzy Jones 
Carleton Young as Jeff
Joan Barclay as Betty Webster
Glenn Strange as Vic Landreau
Charles King as Ed Slade
Slim Whitaker as Sheriff Jim Hanley
John Elliott as Dan Webster

See also
The "Billy the Kid" films starring Buster Crabbe: 
 Billy the Kid Wanted (1941)
 Billy the Kid's Round-Up (1941)
 Billy the Kid Trapped (1942)
 Billy the Kid's Smoking Guns (1942)
 Law and Order (1942) 
 Sheriff of Sage Valley (1942) 
 The Mysterious Rider (1942)
 The Kid Rides Again (1943)
 Fugitive of the Plains (1943)
 Western Cyclone (1943)
 Cattle Stampede (1943)
 The Renegade (1943)
 Blazing Frontier (1943)
 Devil Riders (1943)
 Frontier Outlaws (1944)
 Valley of Vengeance (1944)
 The Drifter (1944) 
 Fuzzy Settles Down (1944)
 Rustlers' Hideout (1944)
 Wild Horse Phantom (1944)
 Oath of Vengeance (1944)
 His Brother's Ghost (1945) 
 Thundering Gunslingers (1945)
 Shadows of Death (1945)
 Gangster's Den (1945)
 Stagecoach Outlaws (1945)
 Border Badmen (1945)
 Fighting Bill Carson (1945)
 Prairie Rustlers (1945) 
 Lightning Raiders (1945)
 Terrors on Horseback (1946)
 Gentlemen with Guns (1946)
 Ghost of Hidden Valley (1946)
 Prairie Badmen (1946)
 Overland Riders (1946)
 Outlaws of the Plains (1946)

References

External links
 

1941 films
American Western (genre) films
1941 Western (genre) films
Producers Releasing Corporation films
Films directed by Sam Newfield
American black-and-white films
1940s English-language films
1940s American films